The International Oral History Association (IOHA) is a professional association established to provide a forum for oral historians around the world. IOHA was formally constituted in June 1996 at the IXth International Oral History Conference in Gothenburg, Sweden. It holds international meetings biennially and publishes a newsletter and journal, Words and Silences/Palabras y Silen, in English and Spanish.

In 2019, the book Giving a voice to the Oppressed? The International Oral History Association as an academic network and political movement edited by Agnès Arp, Annette Leo and Franka Maubach was published, tracing the early history of the IOHA.

IOHA Presidents & Vice-Presidents

Mercedes Vilanova (Spain), 1996–2000; Vice-Presidents Marieta de Moraes Ferreira (Brazil), Alistair Thomson (UK / Australia)
Marieta de Moraes Ferreira (Brazil), 2000–2002; Vice-Presidents Janis Wilton (Australia), Gunhan Danisman (Turquía)
Janis Wilton (Australia), 2002–2004; Vice-Presidents Rina Benmayor (Estados Unidos), Gerardo Necoechea (México)
Rina Benmayor (USA), 2004–2006; Vice-Presidents Funso Afolayan (Nigeria), Gerardo Necoechea (México)
Al Thomson (UK / Australia), 2006–2008; Vice-Presidents Pilar Domínguez (Spain), Alexander von Plato (Germany)
Pilar Domínguez (Spain), 2008–2010; Vice-Presidents Antonio Montenegro (Brazil), Sean Field (South Africa)
Miroslav Vanek (Czech Republic), 2010–2012; Vice-Presidents Juan Gutiérrez (México/Estados Unidos), Miren Llona (Spain)
Anna Maria De La O (Mexico), 2012–2014; Vice-Presidents Andrea Casa Nova Maia (Brazil), Helen Klaebe (Australia)
Indira Chowdhury (India), 2014–2016; Vice-Presidents David Beorlegui (Spain), Mark A. Cave (USA)
Mark A. Cave (USA), 2016–2018; Vice-Presidents Avehi Menon (India), David Beorlegui (Spain)
Sue Anderson (Australia), 2018–2021; Vice-Presidents Mark Wong (Singapore), Outi Fingerroos (Finland)
David Beorlegui (Spain), 2021-2023; Vice-Presidents Mark Wong (Singapore), Martha Norkunas (USA)

International Oral History Conferences

References

External links
IOHA website
IOHA 2014 Barcelona, Spain conference website
IOHA 2016 Bengaluru, India conference website 
IOHA 2018 Jyväskylä, Finland conference website
IOHA 2021 Singapore conference website
Giving a voice to the Oppressed? The International Oral History Association as an academic network and political movement publication website

Oral history